Alexis Sánchez González (born 13 April 1971) is a retired Spanish athlete who specialised in the 110 metres hurdles and 400 metres hurdles. Before Spain he represented his native Cuba, competing at the 1991 World Championships where he reached the semifinals. He was also the 110 metres hurdles World Junior Championships silver medalist in 1990.

Later in his life he started working as a hurdling coach of, among others, Felipe Vivancos.

Competition record

Personal bests
Outdoor
110 metres hurdles – 13.63 (Havana 1992)
400 metres hurdles – 49.22 (Medellín 1996)
Indoor
60 metres hurdles – 7.90 (Madrid 2000)

References

1971 births
Living people
Cuban male hurdlers
Spanish male hurdlers
Athletes (track and field) at the 1991 Pan American Games
Pan American Games silver medalists for Cuba
Pan American Games medalists in athletics (track and field)
Cuban emigrants to Spain
Central American and Caribbean Games silver medalists for Cuba
Central American and Caribbean Games bronze medalists for Cuba
Competitors at the 1990 Central American and Caribbean Games
Competitors at the 1993 Central American and Caribbean Games
Central American and Caribbean Games medalists in athletics
Medalists at the 1991 Pan American Games